The following is a list of the mapped bedrock units in Pennsylvania. The rocks are listed in stratigraphic order.

Note: Some of the Formations are laterally equivalent in age. They are listed in order from West to East in this case.

References

See also
Geology of Pennsylvania